The Noon Whistle is a 1923 American silent comedy film starring Stan Laurel.

Cast
 Stan Laurel as Tanglefoot
 James Finlayson as O'Hallahan, the foreman
 Katherine Grant as Secretary
 Sammy Brooks as A millworker (as Sam Brooks)
 William Gillespie as President of the lumber company
 Noah Young as A millworker
 John B. O'Brien as A millworker (as Jack O'Brien)

See also
 List of American films of 1923

References

External links

1923 films
1923 short films
American silent short films
American black-and-white films
1923 comedy films
Films directed by George Jeske
Silent American comedy films
American comedy short films
1920s American films